Tze'irei Zion ("Youth of Zion", sometimes spelled as Zeire Zion) was a socialist Zionist youth movement in Eastern Europe, in the first half of the 20th century that branched into the Palestine. The movement originated at the very beginning of the 20th century in the Russian Empire.  

The name is also translated as Young Zionists.

Initially Tze'irei Zion was opposed by more radical Zionist and socialist activists from Socialist Revolutionary Party and Bund, who viewed the movement as "reactionary".  

Among the major cities with cells of the movement were Chișinău (then known as Kishinev), Warsaw, Vilnius (then also known as Vilna), and Odessa, all initially within the Russian Empire and later in Romania, Lithuania and Poland as well after the collapse of the Empire after the Russian Revolution of 1917.

During the 1905 Kishinev Pogrom Tze'irei Zion issued a circular in which it called on the Jewish youth to organize self-defense units.

During the Second Aliyah, many of the members of the movement emigrated to Palestine.

In 1920 there was a major split in the movement due to the difficult circumstances during the Third Conference of the movement in Kharkov, which happened a week after Poland invaded Ukraine and captured Kiev, due to which a significant number delegates could not attend. It operated legally in the Soviet Union, until the clamp-down and emigration of nearly all members to Palestine and joined Ahdut HaAvoda. Another part joined the Hapoel Hatzair Zionist group and operated illegally in the Soviet Union. 

A similar left-right split happened in 1923 among the members of the movement which stayed in Poland after the Russian Revolution.

Notable members

Aharon Becker
Max Lazerson
Yisrael Bar-Yehuda
Yitzhak Coren
Yosef Sprinzak

References

Jewish socialism
Zionist organizations
Zionism in Europe
Zionist youth movements
Youth organizations based in Europe